Capel Gwyn is a village in Anglesey, in north-west Wales, in the community of Bryngwran.

References

Villages in Anglesey
Bryngwran